Sicciaemorpha ivyalba is a moth in the subfamily Arctiinae.

References 

Arctiinae